Ryan Peak may refer to:

 Ryan Peak (Antarctica)
 Ryan Peak (Idaho)